Margaret Abraham is a professor of sociology at Hofstra University and served as the 18th president (2014–2018) of the International Sociological Association. She is known for her research regarding gender issues, specifically concerning women, and the ways gender issues are connected to concepts such as globalization, societal customs and norms, and violent behavior.

Career
From 2010-2014 she had been Vice President of Research and  the American Sociological Association Representative of the international Sociological Association. In 2014 she was elected President of the International Sociological Association, the first feminist researcher and activist to hold the position.

She served on the Board of Directors of Sakhi for South Asian Women and the Asian Pacific Islander Coalition on HIV/AIDS

From 2008-2015 she was Special Adviser to the Provost for Diversity Initiatives at Hofstra University, New York.

Her research interests are in the field of gender, and she takes a feminist and intersectional perspective to sociology. Her PhD thesis was on dual ethnic identity and marginality in Indian Jews, in India and Israel.

Selected publications

External links

References

Living people
American women sociologists
American sociologists
Hofstra University faculty
American people of Indian descent
Year of birth missing (living people)
21st-century American women
Presidents of the International Sociological Association